Edward Martin Land (14 November 1858 – 2 May 1927) was a Member of the Queensland Legislative Assembly. He represented the seat of Balonne from 1904 to 1927.

Land died in 1927 and was buried in Toowong Cemetery.

References

Members of the Queensland Legislative Assembly
1858 births
1927 deaths
Burials at Toowong Cemetery